M-12 highway is a Montenegrin roadway.

History

In January 2016, the Ministry of Transport and Maritime Affairs published bylaw on categorisation of state roads. With new categorisation, this road was categorised as M-12 highway.

Major intersections

References

M-12